Lajos Rácz (born in Budapest in 1952) is a Hungarian wrestler. He won an Olympic silver medal in Greco-Roman wrestling in 1980. He won a gold medal at the 1979 World Wrestling Championships.

References

1952 births
Living people
Martial artists from Budapest
Olympic wrestlers of Hungary
Wrestlers at the 1976 Summer Olympics
Wrestlers at the 1980 Summer Olympics
Hungarian male sport wrestlers
Olympic silver medalists for Hungary
Olympic medalists in wrestling
Medalists at the 1980 Summer Olympics
20th-century Hungarian people